Betley Bridge is a disused railway bridge, now a rail trail bridge, which crosses the confluence of the East and West Adur rivers North of Henfield in West Sussex. The Steyning Line from Shoreham to Guildford passed over it, and is now the part of the Downs Link, a public footpath.

During the Second World War the Steyning Line was an important route to move sugar beet from Sussex farms from Henfield station towards the capital, and Betley Bridge was a strategic target for German bombers. Two pillboxes were created, one North and one South, to defend the bridge. A Junkers 88 which was attacking the bridge crashed in Partridge Green to the North West.

References 

The National Archives | Access to Archives
betley bridge | The Wandering Genealogist
https://web.archive.org/web/20120330182423/http://www.greatwalksinbritain.co.uk/Editions/Walks/Sussex%20River%20Adur%20%26%20Shermanbury.pdf
Search – Sussex Ornithological Society
The National Archives | Access to Archives
The National Archives | Access to Archives

Bridges in West Sussex
Rail trail bridges in the United Kingdom